John L. Buono (born 1943) is Chairman and Chief Executive Officer of the New York State Thruway Authority.

Buono graduated from Hudson Valley Community College in 1968, and earned bachelor's and master's degrees from University at Albany, SUNY.  His first job was that of an administrator and teacher at St. Agnes School in Loudonville, New York.  By the mid 1970s, he had switched to civil service, becoming Commissioner of Employment and Training for Rensselaer County and Deputy County Executive.

He was elected Rensselaer County Clerk in 1978, and Rensselaer County Executive in 1985. In 1995, George E. Pataki appointed Buono to direct the New York State Dormitory Authority.   In 1998, Buono assumed the presidency of Hudson Valley Community College.  In 2002, Pataki appointed him to lead the Thruway Authority. He served until the expiration of his term in 2011.

References

1943 births
County executives in New York (state)
Living people
New York (state) Republicans
Presidents of campuses of the State University of New York
University at Albany, SUNY alumni
People from Loudonville, New York
People from Rensselaer County, New York
Hudson Valley Community College alumni